Edward Louis Johnson (born 1937) was an American politician in the state of Kentucky. He served in the Kentucky House of Representatives as a Democrat from 1976 to 1998.

References

1937 births
Living people
Democratic Party members of the Kentucky House of Representatives
Politicians from Owensboro, Kentucky
20th-century American politicians